This is a list of crime films released in 1991.

References

1991